Robert Spencer, 4th Earl of Sunderland (24 October 1701 – 15 September 1729) was a British peer from the Spencer family, the son of Whig politician Charles Spencer, 3rd Earl of Sunderland. His mother was Lady Anne Churchill, the daughter of John Churchill, 1st Duke of Marlborough, and Sarah Churchill, Duchess of Marlborough. Known as Lord Spencer between 1702 and 1722, he succeeded to the Earldom after his father's death in 1722, but died in 1729 with no children. Therefore, his brother, Charles, became 5th Earl of Sunderland, and subsequently 3rd Duke of Marlborough after the death of his aunt, Henrietta Godolphin (née Churchill), 2nd Duchess of Marlborough.

References
Henry L. Snyder, ‘Spencer, Charles, third earl of Sunderland (1675–1722)’, Oxford Dictionary of National Biography, Oxford University Press, Sept 2004; online edn, May 2006 accessed 8 Sept 2007

1701 births
1729 deaths
Earls of Sunderland
Robert
18th-century English nobility
18th-century English landowners